The tables list the Malayalam films released in theaters in the year 2016. Premiere shows and film festival screenings are not considered as releases for this list.

Released films

Dubbed films

Notable deaths

References

2016
2016
Malayalam
Malayalam